Carola Paul (born in the 1960s) is a former competitive figure skater who represented East Germany. She won bronze at the 1980 World Junior Championships, bronze at the 1980 Richmond Trophy, and gold at the 1980 Prague Skate, ahead of Anna Kondrashova. Paul competed at four senior ISU Championships — her best results were eighth at the 1981 World Championships in Hartford, Connecticut and seventh at the 1982 European Championships in Lyon. She represented SC Einheit Dresden.

Competitive highlights

References 

German female single skaters
Living people
Sportspeople from Dresden
World Junior Figure Skating Championships medalists
1960s births